Royce Dwayne Applegate (December 25, 1939 – January 1, 2003) was an American actor and screenwriter who was first billed as Roy Applegate.

Born in Midwest City, Oklahoma, his most visible role was that of Chief Petty Officer Manilow Crocker on the first season of the television series seaQuest DSV.

Applegate portrayed Deputy Crawford in Stir Crazy (1985). In that year, he also appeared in two episodes of Diff'rent Strokes, playing family man-turned-kidnapper Donald Brown, a father who kidnaps character Sam McKinney in order to replace his own dead son.

Applegate portrayed Confederate General James L. Kemper in two films, Gettysburg (1993) and Gods and Generals (2003).

On New Year's Day 2003, Applegate died in his Hollywood Hills home in a fire just one week after his 63rd birthday.

Partial filmography

Film

Television Film

Television

Chesty Anderson, USN (1976) .... Phil
American Raspberry (1977) .... Miracle White Announcer
Harper Valley P.T.A. (1978) .... 'Dutch'
Loose Shoes (1978) .... Delmus
Charlie's Angels (1979, TV Series) .... 'Bingo'
Alligator (1980) .... Callan
Back Roads (1981) .... The Father
Flamingo Road (1981, TV Series) .... 'Tiny'
Hart to Hart (1981, TV Series) .... Billy Ray Thompson
History of the World: Part I (1981) ....Coming Attractions
Little House on the Prairie (1981, TV Series) .... Georgie  
The Dukes of Hazzard (1981-1985, TV Series) .... Insurance Adjuster / Harry Ray Pearson
The Blue and the Gray (1982, TV Mini-Series) .... 1st Cell Reporter
TJ Hooker (1982, TV Series) .... Frank Durbin
Splash (1984) .... Buckwalter
Diff'rent Strokes (1985, TV Series) .... Donald Brown, Sam's Kidnapper
Armed and Dangerous (1986) .... 2nd Toxic Guard
From the Hip (1987) .... Mr. Wilby
Million Dollar Mystery (1987) .... Tugger
Rampage (1987) .... Gene Tippetts
Rain Man (1988) .... (voice)
Mike Hammer: Murder Takes All (1989, TV Series) .... William Bundy
Quantum Leap ...	Sheriff Blount
Quantum Leap ... Announcer
Twin Peaks (1990, TV Series)... Reverend Clarence Brocklehurst
Murder in Mississippi (1990, TV Movie) .... Deputy Winter
Career Opportunities (1991) .... (voice)
White Sands (1992) .... Peterson
Gettysburg (1993) .... Brigadier General James L. Kemper
The Getaway (1994) .... Gun Shop Salesman
seaQuest DSV (1993–1994, TV Series) .... Chief Manilow Crocker
Under Siege 2: Dark Territory (1995) .... Ryback's Cook
Phoenix (1998) .... Dickerman
Dr. Dolittle (1998) .... Huge, sad-looking dog that says "I love you" (voice)
Poodle Springs (1998, TV Movie) .... Ivan, The Motel Manager
JAG (1998–2001, TV Series) .... Craig Allenby
Inherit the Wind (1999, TV Movie) .... George Sillers
O Brother, Where Art Thou? (2000) .... Man With Bullhorn
CSI: Crime Scene Investigation (2000, Episode: "Pilot") .... Mr. Laferty
Artie (2000) .... Officer Clemmons
Nothing But the Truth (2000) .... Danny Whalen
The Rookie (2002) .... Henry
Gods and Generals (2003) .... Brigadier General James Kemper
Seabiscuit (2003) .... 'Dutch' Doogan
Intolerable Cruelty (2003) .... Mr. Gutman
Purgatory Flats (2003) .... Detective Travis McGill (Final Film Role)

Writer
Loose Shoes (1980)
Evil Town (1987)

References

External links

Royce D. Applegate on Yahoo movies

1939 births
2003 deaths
Accidental deaths in California
American male film actors
American male television actors
Deaths from fire in the United States
People from Midwest City, Oklahoma
20th-century American male actors
21st-century American male actors